Neocrepidodera interpunctata is a species of flea beetle from Chrysomelidae family that can be found in Denmark, Finland, Germany, Poland, Russia, and eastern Palaearctic.

References

Beetles described in 1859
Beetles of Europe
interpunctata